John Barstow may refer to:
 John L. Barstow (1832–1913), governor of Vermont
 John Anderson Barstow (1893–1941), British Army officer